Svanenhielm was a family of Danish and Norwegian nobility.

Morten Hansen Seehuusen (1629-1694) was a merchant from Bredstedt in Schleswig-Holstein  who re-located to Stavanger, Norway. His son, Severin Seehusen, (1664-1726) was an official in Bergen as well as in Stavanger and Northern Norway. He owned, among other properties, Damsgård Manor (Damsgård hovedgård) outside Bergen, Svanøy (Svanøy hovudgard) in Sunnfjord and Arnegård in Stavanger. Severin Seehausen was in 1720 ennobled under the name Svanenhielm (lit. Swan Helm), which he had adopted after buying the Svanøy Estate in 1719.

See also
 Danish nobility
 Norwegian nobility

References

Norwegian noble families